The Netherlands cricket team toured New Zealand in March and April 2022 to play one Twenty20 International (T20I) and three One Day International (ODI) matches. The ODI series formed part of the inaugural 2020–2023 ICC Cricket World Cup Super League. Originally scheduled to take place in January or February 2022, the tour was moved back slightly due to COVID-19 quarantine requirements for travelling to New Zealand. In November 2021, New Zealand Cricket confirmed the full dates of the tour.

The initial tour schedule had the first ODI at the University Oval, Dunedin. However, on 27 January 2022, New Zealand Cricket announced a change to the itinerary, with the match being moved to Bay Oval. Prior to the international matches, three warm-up games between the New Zealand XI team and the Netherlands were also played. The New Zealand XI team won both of the 50-over matches, with the third match, a 20-over encounter, abandoned without a ball being bowled due to rain.

The one-off T20I would have been the first time that the Dutch team have played a T20I in New Zealand, and the ODIs were the first time the teams had played each other in that format since the 1996 Cricket World Cup. However, the T20I match was abandoned without a ball being bowled due to rain. New Zealand won the opening ODI match by seven wickets, with Will Young scoring his first century in the format. New Zealand won the second ODI by 118 runs, with Tom Latham scoring his highest total in ODI cricket with an unbeaten 140 runs. New Zealand won the third and final match by 115 runs, with another century from Will Young, to take the series 3–0.

The series also marked the international retirement of Ross Taylor, who played in his 450th and final match for New Zealand.

Squads

On 13 March 2022, Michael Rippon was added to the Dutch squad for the tour. Ahead of the ODI series, New Zealand's Mark Chapman tested positive for COVID-19, with George Worker named as his replacement.

Warm-up matches

Only T20I

ODI series

1st ODI

2nd ODI

3rd ODI

References

External links
 Series home at ESPN Cricinfo

2022 in Dutch cricket
2022 in New Zealand cricket
International cricket competitions in 2021–22
New Zealand